Secreto de confesión is a Mexican telenovela produced by Ernesto Alonso for Telesistema Mexicano in 1965.

Cast 
Carmen Montejo
Carmelita González
Roberto Cañedo
Bertha Moss

References

External links 

Mexican telenovelas
1965 telenovelas
Televisa telenovelas
Spanish-language telenovelas
1965 Mexican television series debuts
1965 Mexican television series endings